Zuniga is a genus of ant mimicking jumping spiders that was first described by George and Elizabeth Peckham in 1892.  it contains two species, found in South America, Costa Rica, and Mexico: Z. laeta and Z. magna. It is a senior synonym of Arindas and Simprulloides.

References

External links
Photo of Zuniga from Costa Rica by Lisa Taylor, Arizona State University

Salticidae
Salticidae genera
Spiders of Central America
Spiders of South America